Brunswick was launched at Hull in 1829 as an East Indiaman. She sailed to India several times under a license from the British East India Company, but was wrecked in 1832.

Career
Brunswick entered Lloyd's Register in 1829 with Rosendale, master, changing to A. Parker, E. Gibson, owner, and trade Hull–Calcutta. Brunswick, A. Parker, master, sailed to Madras and Bombay on 21 April 1829. On 2 December 1831 Brunswick,, J. Palmer, master, sailed to Bengal.

Fate
Brunswick, Blewett, master, wrecked on 11 October 1832 in the River Hooghly. She was returning to London from Calcutta. She wrecked on Sagar Island, India with the loss of a crew member. She was on a voyage from Bengal, India to London.

Citations

References
 
Selection of Reports and Papers of the House of Commons: Commerce and manufactures and admeasurement of shipping, (1836), Vol. 22.

1829 ships
Age of Sail merchant ships of England
Maritime incidents in October 1832